The Oceanian section of the 2018 FIFA World Cup qualification acted as qualifiers for the 2018 FIFA World Cup, to be held in Russia, for national teams which are members of the Oceania Football Confederation (OFC). A total of 0.5 slots (i.e. 1 inter-confederation play-off slot) in the final tournament was available for OFC teams.

The 2016 edition of the OFC Nations Cup once again doubled as the second round of the OFC qualifying competition for the 2018 FIFA World Cup (similar to the 2012 OFC Nations Cup and the OFC qualifying competition for the 2014 FIFA World Cup). Unlike in 2012, however, the team that won the qualifying competition and advanced to the intercontinental play-off, New Zealand, was the same team that also won the OFC Nations Cup and represented the OFC at the 2017 FIFA Confederations Cup.

Format
The qualification structure was as follows:
First round: Four teams (American Samoa, Cook Islands, Samoa, and Tonga) played a round-robin tournament at a single country. The winner advanced to the second round.
Second round (2016 OFC Nations Cup): Eight teams (Fiji, New Caledonia, New Zealand, Papua New Guinea, Solomon Islands, Tahiti, Vanuatu, and the first round winner) played the tournament at a single country. For the group stage, they were divided into two groups of four teams. The top three teams of each group advanced to the third round.
Third round: Six teams which had advanced from the second round were divided into two groups of three teams to play home-and-away round-robin matches. The two group winners met in a two-legged match with the winner advancing to the inter-confederation play-offs.

The OFC had considered different proposals of the qualifying tournament. A previous proposal adopted by the OFC in October 2014 had the eight teams divided into two groups of four teams to play home-and-away round-robin matches in the second round, followed by the top two teams of each group advancing to the third round to play in a single group of home-and-away round-robin matches to decide the winner of the 2016 OFC Nations Cup which would both qualify to the 2017 FIFA Confederations Cup and advance to the inter-confederation play-offs. However, it was later reported in April 2015 that the OFC had reversed its decision, and the 2016 OFC Nations Cup will be played as a one-off tournament similar to the 2012 OFC Nations Cup.

Entrants
All 11 FIFA-affiliated national teams from the OFC entered qualification. The four lowest ranked teams (based on FIFA World Ranking and sporting reasons) entered the first round, while the other seven teams entered the second round.

Schedule
The schedule of the competition was as follows.

The inter-confederation play-offs were scheduled to be played between 6–14 November 2017.

First round

The match schedule was revealed on 30 July 2015, following a draw held at OFC Headquarters in Auckland, New Zealand.

Second round

The draw for the second round was held as part of the 2018 FIFA World Cup Preliminary Draw on 25 July 2015, starting 18:00 MSK (UTC+3), at the Konstantinovsky Palace in Strelna, Saint Petersburg, Russia.

Group stage

Group A

Group B

Knockout stage

While the results of the OFC Nations Cup knockout stage matches have no effect on the teams qualified for the third round of World Cup qualifying, for statistical purposes these matches are considered part of World Cup qualifying, with FIFA counting goalscorers in the qualifying statistics, and cards given may contribute to suspensions in the third round of World Cup qualifying (similar to the setup for 2014 World Cup qualifying).

Third round

The draw for the third round was held on 8 July 2016, 11:00 NZST (UTC+12), at the OFC headquarters in Auckland, New Zealand.

Groups

Group A

Group B

Final
The draw for the final (which decided the order of legs) was held on 15 June 2017, 16:00 NZST (UTC+12), at the OFC headquarters in Auckland, New Zealand.

The winner of the final advanced to inter-confederation play-offs. Dates were set for the two-legged final as being between 28 August and 5 September 2017.

Inter-confederation play-offs

The draw for the inter-confederation play-offs was held as part of the 2018 FIFA World Cup Preliminary Draw on 25 July 2015, starting 18:00 MSK (UTC+3), at the Konstantinovsky Palace in Strelna, Saint Petersburg. The first-placed team from OFC was drawn against the fifth-placed team from CONMEBOL, with the OFC team hosting the first leg.

Top goalscorers
There were 106 goals scored in 37 matches (including 2 international play-offs), for an average of 2.86 goals per match.
8 goals

 Chris Wood

7 goals

 Raymond Gunemba

5 goals

 Teaonui Tehau

4 goals

 Taylor Saghabi
 Roy Krishna
 Nigel Dabinyaba
 Michael Foster

3 goals

 Marco Rojas
 Ryan Thomas
 Henry Fa'arodo

References

External links

Qualifiers – Oceania, FIFA.com
2018 FIFA WORLD CUP RUSSIA™ OFC QUALIFIERS , oceaniafootball.com

 
Ofc
FIFA World Cup qualification (OFC)
2015–16 in OFC football
2016–17 in OFC football
2017–18 in OFC football